Walter James Alonte Hall (born July 16, 1989), known as James Hall, is a Filipino professional footballer who plays as a right-back and a central midfield for Stallion Laguna F.C. and the Philippines national team.

Early life 
James Hall was born in Glasgow, Scotland. His mother Lori hails from Bacolod, Negros Occidental while his father James Hall Sr. is from the United Kingdom. Hall spent his academy years in Everton from 2005 to 2008.

Club career

Everton 
In 2007, Hall signed his first professional contract with Everton after being with the club since the age of 14. He was with the team until 2010.

FC Meralco Manila 
Hall moved to the Philippines in 2016 and signed with FC Meralco Manila (then known as Loyola Meralco Sparks). At the end of the 2016–2017 season, the UFL was discontinued to pave the way for the newly formed Philippines Football League. Hall afterwards departed FC Meralco Manila for the newly formed Davao Aguilas FC.

Davao Aguilas Football Club 
In 2017, Hall moved to Davao Aguilas FC, a newly formed club which took part in the Philippines Football League. Hall was an active member of Davao's roster and started in the final of the inaugural edition of the Copa Paulino Alcantara. They went on to settle for runner-up after falling to Kaya-FC Iloilo in extra time, 1–0. After two seasons, Davao Aguilas disbanded at the end of 2018.

Stallion Laguna F.C. 
In 2021, Hall was signed by Stallion Laguna F.C. They went on to finish third in the 2021 Copa Paulino Alcantara.

International career 
After the Philippine Men's National Football Team rose to fame in the 2010 AFF Suzuki Cup, Hall reinforced the training pool of the Azkals in February 2011 alongside brother Ryan now known as (DJ Ryan Hall) prior to the 2012 AFC Challenge Cup Pre-qualifiers.

Months later in June, Hall was called up once again by then Azkals Coach Hans Michael Weiss for the Philippines’ training camp in Bahrain for the second round of the FIFA World Cup Qualifiers. Once added to the squad, Hall started both friendlies for the Azkals against the Bahrain U-23 National Team playing central midfield. Hall suited up for the Philippines once more in the CTFA International Tournament in 2017. He picked up two official senior national team caps under Coach Marlon Maro as they went on to place second overall in the tournament.

Honors

Club 
Runner-Up 2018 Copa Paulino Alcantara

Second Runner-Up 2021 Copa Paulino Alcantara

National team 
Runner-Up 2018 CTFA International Tournament

Personal life 
Hall is also the brother-in-law of former Philippines internationals Phil and James Younghusband. He has two siblings - younger brother DJ Ryan Hall and older sister Margaret.

References 

1989 births
Living people
Footballers from Glasgow
Citizens of the Philippines through descent
Filipino people of English descent
English people of Filipino descent
Filipino British sportspeople
British Asian footballers
Filipino footballers
Association football midfielders
Association football fullbacks
Everton F.C. players
F.C. Meralco Manila players
Davao Aguilas F.C. players
Philippines international footballers